The Salonika Terrorists (Macedonian: Солунските Атентатори, literally "The Salonika Assassins"), also known as The Assassins from Salonika is a 1961 Yugoslav film. It follows the story of the Boatmen of Thessaloniki.

Awards 
 "Jelen" (FYIF, 1961)  — traditional award from the public;
 "Special diploma for Production Design" (1961) — awarded to Dime Šumka;
 "Jury Award for the Successful Cultivation of the Action Film Genre" (1961) - awarded to Žika Mitrović

External links 
 
 
 http://maccinema.com/filmovi_detali.asp?IDMAKFILM=84

1961 films
Films directed by Zhivorad Mitrovik
Yugoslav historical films
1960s historical films